The phrase "What would Jesus do?", often abbreviated to WWJD, became popular particularly in the United States in the early 1900s after the widely read book by Charles Sheldon entitled, In His Steps: What Would Jesus Do?. The phrase had a resurgence in the US and elsewhere in the 1990s and as a personal motto for adherents of Christianity who used the phrase as a reminder of their belief in a moral imperative to act in a manner that would demonstrate the love of Jesus through the actions of the adherents.

In popular consciousness, in the 1990s, the WWJD abbreviation was placed on a wristband that became popular among Christians and youth groups.

History

Theological background

The Roman Catholic Church emphasizes the concept of Imitatio Christi (imitation of Christ), which is summarized well in the English phrase "What Would Jesus Do?"

John Wesley, the founder of the Methodist Church, in 1766 postulated the concept of Christian perfection, a moment in the life of a Christian at which the regeneration effectuated by the Holy Spirit results in a "perfection in love" which means that at least at that moment one is being motivated wholly by love of God and neighbor, with no taint of sin or ulterior motives in effect. While such Christian perfection is expressed in outward action, it is also the effect of grace. Indeed, Wesley could speak of sanctification by faith as an analogous doctrine to the more widely held belief in justification by faith. Because Christian perfection is also visible in outward good works and a rigorously moral lifestyle, adherents of the Holiness movement assumed that a perfectly moral lifestyle is a consequence (not the cause) of the state of grace and ultimate salvation.

Earlier appearances of the term, 1420s–1891
Charles Spurgeon, a well-known evangelical Baptist preacher in London, used the phrase "what would Jesus do" in quotation marks several times in a sermon he gave on June 28, 1891. In his sermon he cites the source of the phrase as a book written in Latin by Thomas à Kempis between 1418 and 1427, Imitatio Christi (The Imitation of Christ).

The Rev. A.B. Simpson, founder of the Christian and Missionary Alliance Church, wrote both the lyrics and music of a Gospel Hymn "What Would Jesus Do" with a copyright date of 1891. It can be found at #669 in Hymns of the Christian Life.

1896 novel
Charles Sheldon's 1896 book In His Steps  was subtitled "What Would Jesus Do?"  Sheldon's novel grew out of a series of sermons he delivered in his Congregationalist church in Topeka, Kansas. Unlike the previous nuances mentioned above, Sheldon's theology was shaped by a commitment to Christian Socialism. The ethos of Sheldon's approach to the Christian life was expressed in this phrase "What Would Jesus Do", with Jesus being a moral example as well as  a Saviour figure. Sheldon's ideas coalesced with those that formed into the Social Gospel espoused by Walter Rauschenbusch. Indeed, Rauschenbusch acknowledged that his Social Gospel owed its inspiration directly to Sheldon's novel, and Sheldon himself identified his own theology with the Social Gospel.

Due to a mistake by the original publisher, the copyright for Sheldon's novel was never established and multiple publishers were able to print and sell the novel. This caused the novel to be easily affordable and it sold 30 million copies worldwide, making it one of the top 50 bestselling novels ever.

In this popular novel (it had been translated into 21 languages by 1935), Rev. Henry Maxwell encounters a homeless man who challenges him to take seriously the imitation of Christ. The homeless man has difficulty understanding why, in his view, so many Christians ignore the poor:

I heard some people singing at a church prayer meeting the other night,

"All for Jesus, all for Jesus,
All my being's ransomed powers,
All my thoughts, and all my doings,
All my days, and all my hours."

and I kept wondering as I sat on the steps outside just what they meant by it. It seems to me there's an awful lot of trouble in the world that somehow wouldn't exist if all the people who sing such songs went and lived them out. I suppose I don't understand. But what would Jesus do? Is that what you mean by following His steps? It seems to me sometimes as if the people in the big churches had good clothes and nice houses to live in, and money to spend for luxuries, and could go away on summer vacations and all that, while the people outside the churches, thousands of them, I mean, die in tenements, and walk the streets for jobs, and never have a piano or a picture in the house, and grow up in misery and drunkenness and sin."

This leads to many of the novel's characters asking, "What would Jesus do?" when faced with decisions of some importance. This has the effect of making the characters embrace Christianity more seriously and to focus on what they see as its core — the life of Christ.

In 1993, Garrett W. Sheldon (great-grandson of the original author) and Deborah Morris published What Would Jesus Do? : a contemporary retelling of Charles M. Sheldon's classic In His Steps. Garrett Sheldon states that his updated version "is based on many actual events in the lives of believers."

It is possible that Sheldon was familiar with either Spurgeon or Thomas, or that he was independently inspired.

1990s
At Calvary Reformed Church,  in Holland, Michigan a youth group leader named Janie Tinklenberg, began a grassroots movement to help the teenagers in her group remember the phrase; it spread worldwide in the 1990s among Christian youth, who wore bracelets bearing the initials WWJD. Later, a sequel bracelet was generated with the initials "FROG," to provide an answer to "WWJD." FROG was an acronym for "Fully Rely On God."

2000s
In 2005, Garry Wills wrote "What Jesus Meant", in which he examined "What Would Jesus Really Do" (also a book review in Esquire Magazine).

2010s
In April 2010 a film, WWJD, starring Adam Gregory and based on In His Steps by Charles Sheldon, was released on DVD.
On March 31, 2015, a sequel film was released WWJD What Would Jesus Do? The Journey Continues. The second film using the moniker WWJD II was The Woodcarver which was released in 2012. It has a similar theme but different characters.

Snowclones
The expression has become a snowclone with the promotion of phrases such as "What would Lincoln do?" and "What would Reagan do?"

Management and leadership

The term "What Would Jesus Do?" or "WWJD" is also perceived as a fundamental management and leadership principle given Jesus' methodology of going to the marketplace to preach and lead by example. In modern management principles, more academic and professional references are going to the gemba or Management by Walking Around.

See also

Christian ethics
Choose the right
Jesusism
The Law of Christ
Ministry of Jesus
Sermon on the Mount

References 

1990s fads and trends
Cultural depictions of Jesus
English phrases
Slogans
Snowclones
1890s neologisms
Quotations from literature